Ashakhet II was a High Priest of Ptah during the 21st Dynasty. He served during the reigns of Siamun and Psusennes II.

Ashakhet II is known from a genealogy known as Berlin 23673, where he is said to be a Chief of Secrets of the Great Seat and a prophet (hry-sSt3 (n) st-wrt, hm nTr). He is also mentioned in a genealogy from the Louvre where he is said to be a High Priest of Ptah.

Ashakhet was the son of Neterkheperre Meryptah called Pipi II by an unknown mother. He would later be succeeded by his son Ankhefensekhmet.

References

Publications Regarding Berlin 23673 and Louvre 96 
L. Borchardt, Die Mittel zur Zeitlichen Festlegung von Punkten de Aegyptischen Geschichte und ihre Anwendung, 1935, pg 96-112
E. Chassinat, Recueil de travaux relatifs à la philologie et à l'archéologie égyptiennes et assyriennes, 22 (1900) 16-17, No 54
Malinines, Posner, Vercoutter, Catalogue des steles de Sérapéum de Memphis, I, 1968, No. 52, pp. 48–49
Kees, Zeitschrift fur Agyptischer Sprache, 87 (1962), 146-9

Memphis High Priests of Ptah
People of the Twenty-first Dynasty of Egypt